Viktor Viktorovich Demidov (born 8 November 1964) is a Russian professional football coach and a former player.

References

External links
 
 

Russian footballers
Russian football managers
1964 births
Living people
FC Daugava managers
Expatriate football managers in Latvia
FC Dynamo Saint Petersburg managers
Association football defenders
FC Tosno managers
Expatriate football managers in Kyrgyzstan
Russian expatriate football managers